"I'm a Drifter" is a song written and sung by Bobby Goldsboro, which he released in 1969. The song spent 10 weeks on the Billboard Hot 100 chart, peaking at No. 46, while reaching No. 14 on Billboard's Easy Listening chart, No. 22 of Billboard's Hot Country Singles chart, No. 44 on the Cash Box Top 100, No. 36 on Canada's RPM 100, and No. 9 on RPM's Adult Contemporary chart.

Chart performance

References 

1968 songs
1969 singles
Bobby Goldsboro songs
United Artists Records singles
Songs written by Bobby Goldsboro
Song recordings produced by Bob Montgomery (songwriter)